The 1992 Fernleaf Butter Classic was a women's tennis tournament played on outdoor hard courts at the Wellington Renouf Tennis Centre in Wellington, New Zealand and was part of the Tier V category of the 1992 WTA Tour. It was the fifth and last edition of the tournament and was held from 3 February until 9 February 1992. Unseeded Noëlle van Lottum won the singles title and earned $18,000 first-prize money.

Finals

Singles
 Noëlle van Lottum defeated  Donna Faber 6–4, 6–0
 It was Van Lottum's only singles title of her career.

Doubles
 Belinda Borneo /  Clare Wood defeated  Jo-Anne Faull /  Julie Richardson 6–0, 7–6(7–5)

References

External links
 ITF tournament edition details
 Tournament draws

Fernleaf Classic
Wellington Classic
Fern
February 1992 sports events in New Zealand